Bükkzsérc is a village in Borsod-Abaúj-Zemplén county, Hungary. It is the southern border of Bükk National Park.

History 
The settlement was first mentioned in 1248, as property of the bishopric of Eger.
Estate of the Carthusian order in 1457. In 1552 the town was ransacked by the Turks.

Sights 
Its Catholic church (1776) is a monument. 
In its Calvinist church (1828) there are several extraordinary inner woodcarvings.
About 30 peasant houses enjoy local protection.
The exhibition of the Panish Memorial Hall shows the folk life on old photo replicas. 
The first wood carvings of the country picked by a panel of experts are of ancient monument character, we can see them in the Pelyhe Cellar Museum.
We also have to mention the world war monuments, 
the private hunt trophy collections and
the horseshoe shaped rocky (natural) formation in the Hódos hill with a diameter of 100 m.
Within its boundaries we can find the best ground cycling track in the area.

Main events 
 Whit Saturday's Wine Competition
 Village Days in summer

Gallery

References

External links 
 Street map 
 
 Old photos from Bükkzsérc

Populated places in Borsod-Abaúj-Zemplén County